"Only You" is the 46th single by the J-pop group Morning Musume, released on June 15, 2011 on the Zetima label.

Background 
"Only You" is the second single to feature the four 9th generation members. The single was released in four versions: a regular edition (catalog number EPCE-5785), and limited editions A, B and C that include a bonus DVD; each edition also sports a different cover. The first press of all editions came with a serial number card, which can be used to enter a draw for tickets to the single's release event. The Single V was released 2 weeks later on June 29. Certain retailers which sold the single, including HMV and Tower Records, also offered a B3 poster to customers who purchased the CD at their shop.

The single was originally due to be released on May 18; however, due to the effects of the earthquake and tsunami, the release was delayed.

The music video was released on the group's official YouTube channel on May 23.

Members 
 5th generation: Ai Takahashi, Risa Niigaki
 6th generation: Sayumi Michishige, Reina Tanaka
 8th generation: Aika Mitsui
 9th generation: Mizuki Fukumura, Erina Ikuta, Riho Sayashi, Kanon Suzuki

Only You Vocalists

Main Voc: Ai Takahashi, Reina Tanaka

Center Voc: Risa Niigaki, Riho Sayashi

Minor Voc: Sayumi Michishige, Aika Mitsui, Mizuki Fukumura, Erina Ikuta

Yamete yo Sinbad! Vocalists

Main Voc: Ai Takahashi, Reina Tanaka

Center Voc: Risa Niigaki, Sayumi Michishige, Aika Mitsui

Minor Voc: Mizuki Fukumura, Erina Ikuta, Riho Sayashi, Kanon Suzuki

Track listing

Charts

References 

2011 singles
Japanese-language songs
Morning Musume songs
Songs written by Tsunku
Song recordings produced by Tsunku
Zetima Records singles
Japanese synth-pop songs
Torch songs